J. Michael Patterson is the current Director of the Oklahoma Department of Transportation. Patterson was appointed ODOT Director by the Oklahoma Transportation Commission in March 2013, succeeding retiring Director Gary Ridley.

Career
Mike Patterson earned his Bachelor's degree in Accounting and Master's degree in Finance from the University of Central Oklahoma. Patterson first worked for the Oklahoma Department of Transportation (then known as the State Highway Department) in 1970 as a summer intern. His father worked in ODOT's planning division from 1961 to 1987. Patterson joined the Department full time as Deputy Comptroller in 1980 before being promoted to Department Comptroller in 1984. In 1999 he was named Assistant Director of Finance and Administration, serving in that capacity until 2010. In 2010 he was promoted to Deputy Director/Chief Financial Officer of ODOT, the Department's third highest ranking official.

Personal life
Patterson and his wife Joy live in Edmond. They have two daughters and five granddaughters.

References

Living people
State cabinet secretaries of Oklahoma
Heads of Oklahoma state agencies
University of Central Oklahoma alumni
Year of birth missing (living people)